Sultan bin Abdullah bin Salem Al-Ghannam (born 6 May 1994) is a Saudi Arabian professional footballer who plays as a right-back for Saudi Pro League club Al-Nassr and the Saudi national team.

Club career
Al-Ghannam began his career at hometown club Al-Zulfi. On 27 August 2015, Al-Ghannam joined Pro League side Al-Faisaly.

On 12 March 2018, Al-Ghannam joined Al-Nassr on a free transfer, signing a four-year contract with the club. In his first season at the club, Al-Ghannam won the 2018–19 Pro League. On 21 September 2021, Al-Ghannam renewed his contract with Al-Nassr until the end of the 2023–24 season.

International career
Al-Ghannam was included in Saudi Arabia's squad for the 2019 AFC Asian Cup in the United Arab Emirates.

On 20 November 2019, Al-Ghannam was named in the squad for the 24th Arabian Gulf Cup.

On 11 November 2022, Al-Ghannam was named in the squad for the 2022 FIFA World Cup.

Career statistics

Honours

Club
Al-Nassr
 Saudi Professional League: 2018–19
 Saudi Super Cup: 2019, 2020

References

External links 
 

Living people
1994 births
People from Riyadh Province
Saudi Arabian footballers
Association football defenders
Al-Zulfi FC players
Al-Faisaly FC players
Al Nassr FC players
Saudi Fourth Division players
Saudi Second Division players
Saudi Professional League players
2019 AFC Asian Cup players
Saudi Arabia international footballers
2022 FIFA World Cup players